Piasa is an unincorporated community in Macoupin County, Illinois, United States. Piasa has a post office with ZIP code 62079.

References

Unincorporated communities in Macoupin County, Illinois
Unincorporated communities in Illinois